The Nineveh Plain Protection Units or NPU is an Assyrian military organization that was formed in late 2014, largely but not exclusively by Assyrians in Iraq to defend themselves against Islamic State of Iraq and the Levant. The Nineveh Plains is a region where Assyrians originate from and have lived there for thousands of years.

Statistics
By December 2014, the group said it had between 500 and 1,000 men in training, that the US was helping train them, and that financial support was coming mostly from Assyrians in the US and Europe. In February 2015 there were unverified reports that the group had 5,000 Assyrian men registered to be trained, 500 are already training for combat, and 500 volunteers from the group stationed in threatened towns.

The Assyrian Policy Institute reports that the NPU has 2,000 men registered to be trained awaiting approval and funding from the Federal government of Iraq and that they currently have 600 active soldiers deployed and running the security in towns such as Bakhdida, Karamlesh, partly in Bartella and the ancient city of Nimrud

A 2019 testimony from Assyrian activist Reine Hanna at the United States Commission on International Religious Freedom claimed that the rate of Assyrian return in towns guarded by the NPU was significantly higher than those controlled by other forces following the end of the Islamic State's occupation of the Nineveh Plain. The NPU-guarded Assyrian town of Bakhdida, for example, saw a 70% return of the town's original Assyrian population (about 35,000 Assyrians). In Tesqopa, which is controlled by KRG Peshmerga, the rate of return is about 20% of the original Assyrian population. In Tel Keppe, which is controlled by Brigade 50, the return rate of the original Assyrian population is about 7%.

Activities
 
In May 2016, NPU participated in fighting at Tesqopa along with Peshmerga forces.

In September 2016, NPU soldiers repelled an ISIL effort to retake Tesqopa.

Also in September 2016, NPU liberated the Shabak village of Badanah from ISIL, with the support of international coalition airstrikes.

In October 2016, NPU, alongside Iraqi Army forces liberated the Town of Bartella from ISIL.

On the 19th of October, 2016, NPU and the Iraqi Army liberated the Town of Bakhdida from ISIL. They currently run the security profile of the town and protected the town during its first Christmas mass in two years.

In December 2016 Jameel al-Jameel, a member of the Nineveh Plains Protection Units claimed that Kurdish soldiers at checkpoints were interrogating and preventing Assyrian NPU soldiers and civilians seeking to enter the Nineveh Plain.

In July 2017, NPU was involved in clashes with the Babylon Brigades, led by Rayan al-Kildani. Two days prior to the incident, NPU captured 6 members of the Babylon Brigades on allegations of stealing ancient artefacts from Mar Behnam Monastery. Babylon Brigades have since been expelled by the Iraqi Prime Minister Office & PMU High Command from all of Hamdaniya District. NPU has taken control of Mar Behnam Monastery.

In December 2018, the Iraqi Government provided funding to the NPU to recruit another 100 troops.

Security
The Nineveh Plains Protection Units currently run the security in all major towns in the Al-Hamdaniya District (Bakhdida and Karamlesh), while in Bartella the security is contested by PMF Brigade 30 or known as the Shabak Militia with the support of the Badr Organization leaving the NPU outnumbered. The ancient city of Nimrud is also under the control of the Nineveh Plains Protection Units

See also
 List of armed groups in the Iraqi Civil War
 Assyrian Democratic Movement
 Nineveh Plain Forces
 Nineveh Plains Security Forces
 Dwekh Nawsha

References

2014 establishments in Iraq
Anti-ISIL factions in Iraq
Assyrian organizations
War in Iraq (2013–2017)
Iraqi insurgency (2011–2013)
Military units and formations established in 2014
Military wings of political parties
Paramilitary forces of Iraq